"Through the Looking Glass" is episode 21 of season 2 in the television show Angel. Written and directed by Tim Minear, it was originally broadcast on May 15, 2001 on the WB network. It is the second episode in a three-part arc.

In "Through the Looking Glass", Angel and the others are still trapped in the Pylea dimension. Cordelia finds herself appointed ruling princess of Pylea by an order of priests and ordered to mate with a human-like creature called the Groosalugg, while Angel seeks to help Lorne the Host bond with his estranged family, which takes a turn when Angel saves a runaway human slave, named Winifred "Fred" Burkle, the same L.A. librarian who was sucked into Pylea five years earlier. Also, Wesley and Gunn manage to escape from the castle only to end up as captives of human Pylean rebels plotting to overthrow the monarchy.

Plot
Angel, Wesley, and Gunn are shocked to see Cordelia has been crowned princess of Pylea. She jokingly demands their heads be cut off, but quickly restates herself. After she dismisses the guards, Cordelia recounts how she became princess due to her visions. Lorne confirms his people have been waiting for one cursed with the sight that will save them all.

Lorne takes Angel to his family's house, where Lorne's cousin Landok identifies Angel as a hero. Angel, who is made the special guest of their upcoming village feast, tells stories to the people of Pylea while Lorne is ignored. Landok offers Angel the honor of "swinging the crebbil in the Bach-nal," and Angel agrees to take part - before he learns it means beheading a human so the people of Pylea can feast on it. Winifred “Fred” Burkle is brought forth, but Angel refuses to kill her. The two are able to make an escape when Lorne begins to sing, causing severe pain to the Pyleans.

While perusing the castle library, Wesley discovers "the cursed one" will have to perform something called a "com-shuk" with a Groosalugg. He considers asking the priests to translate the book, until he realizes it is part of a trilogy marked with three animals - wolf, ram and hart - linking the priests to the evil law firm back in Los Angeles. Silas, one of the priests, arrives to inform Cordelia that the Groosalugg has been summoned and that the "com-shuk" is a mating ritual. Wesley, Gunn, and Cordelia try to escape through a sewer tunnel, but Cordelia is caught by the priests and dragged back to her throne. Heavily guarded, Cordelia worries about mating with the demon, until Silas introduces the Groosalugg, who is a handsome and muscular young male.

Fred leads Angel to a cave where she has been staying for a long while. Fred talks nervously as she crazily scribbles on the cave walls. Angel finds Fred's driver's license and realizes she is the girl from Cordy's vision. She doesn't believe him when he tells her of her life in LA and how she got to Pylea because it's been so long, she's doesn't want to believe.  Angel is attacked by guards as he tries to lead Fred to the castle, and when he tries to shift into his vampire face, instead he becomes pure demon and brutally rips through the guard's body with his super-sized teeth. The other runs and Angel takes off as well, leaving Fred frightened and alone. Wesley and Gunn wander lost, until the demon Angel attacks them. It takes a while before Wesley can recognize Angel's tattoo. A short distance away, Fred coats her hand in blood and is able to lure Angel away from his friends with the smell. Demon Angel sees his reflection in water at Fred's cave and is suddenly motivated to switch back to human form. Gunn and Wesley are surrounded and tied up by rebels who want to send a message to the castle. Gunn and Wesley try to convince the rebels that they know the princess and suggest they use them to contact her. The rebels agree, but their idea involves decapitation. Fred comforts Angel as he painfully deals with the aftermath of being controlled by the demon inside of him. He concludes that his friends saw what he really was and now he can never go back to them.

The Groosalugg tells Cordelia that his human qualities make him unappealing to his people, so he battled with demons to end his existence, but after defeating them earned the name for bravery and strength. Lorne is brought before Cordelia for judgment and he is almost sentenced to death, but Cordelia pardons him and then kicks him out so she can be alone with her future mate. Cordelia explains to the Groosalugg that she is not a princess, but he doesn't believe her because of what he was told. Silas tells his fellow priests that the princess has requested paper so she can write proclamations and do good for Pylea. He doesn't like the fact that she has not taken part in the com-shuk yet. Cordelia's proclamation writing is interrupted by Silas who brings forth a large platter and orders Groosalugg out of the room. He tells her she and Groosalugg are just tools and she will do what she is told. Cordelia refuses to accept that, until she is shocked into silence as Silas reveals Lorne's head displayed on the platter.

Production details
Makeup Artist Dayne Johnson says that this episode was one of the most time-consuming for the makeup department. The full-body green makeup used to transform Andy Hallett into a Pylean took three hours, and the dozens of Pylean extras required 14 makeup artists beginning at 2:30am.

Acting
Series creator Joss Whedon briefly appears in this episode playing Lorne's Pylean brother, "Numfar". Whedon wanted his appearance to be a big surprise, and so had his make-up done in another make-up trailer. When Andy Hallett, the actor who played Lorne, saw Whedon doing a "Dance of Joy" at rehearsal, he thought the unknown actor was "trash".

Continuity
 Angel tells children stories of his adventures in "To Shanshu in L.A." such as when he cut Lindsey's hand off. Later, Landok asks Angel to tell a story about the events of "I Fall to Pieces".
 After learning of the mating ritual, Cordelia tells Wesley, "I want you to find me a dimension where some demon doesn't want to impregnate me with its spawn. Is that just too much to ask?" Cordelia was impregnated with the spawn of a Haxil demon in "Expecting" and was impregnated with the spawn of a Skilosh demon in "Epiphany."
This episode reveals that the powers of Wolfram and Hart extend far beyond the human dimension when their animal symbols—a wolf, a ram, and a deer (hart)—are seen by Wes, Gunn, and Cordy in Pylea. In Season Five, Illyria remembers "the Wolf, Ram, and Hart" of her long-ago era, indicating this was the organization's original name.
As was pointed out as recently as "Disharmony," in the Buffyverse, soulless vampires are not truly humans who have been transformed into vampires, but demons who inhabit the bodies of dead humans to become vampires, their personas shaped by the humans' memories. Prior to regaining his soul, Angel, originally named Liam, was such a being, a demon who, in combination with Angel's original personality, became Angel's evil persona Angelus; only the restoration of Angel's human soul (e.g. the original Liam whom the demon supplanted) suppressed the demon/Angelus. Angel's demonic form in this episode, which he inadvertently assumes when displaying his vampiric nature, is thus presumably the demon who originally possessed Liam's dead body, looking as it would without the human influence that originally caused it to become Angelus.

Cultural references
 Through the Looking-Glass: The episode's title is taken from the children's book by Lewis Carroll.
 Durdane series : Also notable is a flavor of imagery, gadgetry and some plot devices from the books of Jack Vance's Durdane series, the first being 'The Faceless Man'.
 Lorne calls Angel "Hans Christian Tarantino" at the conclusion of Angel's storytelling session about the events in To Shanshu in L.A., presumably because Hans Christian Andersen was a storyteller, and Quentin Tarantino is known for directing action/graphic movies.
When Gunn and Wesley are in the woods, Wesley shushes him because he hears something. Gunn asks him if he's having a "Blair Witch moment", referring to the cult film The Blair Witch Project.

Reception
The "Pylea" arc, which begins with the previous episode and concludes with the season finale, "There's No Place Like Plrtz Glrb", appears ninth on Slayage.com's list of the top 10 episodes of Angel.

References

External links

 

Angel (season 2) episodes
2001 American television episodes
Television episodes about rebellions
Television episodes about slavery
Television episodes directed by Tim Minear
Television episodes written by Tim Minear